Fritz Semb-Thorstvedt (18 May 1892 – 21 November 1975) was a Norwegian footballer. He played in three matches for the Norway national football team from 1918 to 1919.

References

External links
 

1892 births
1975 deaths
Norwegian footballers
Norway international footballers
Place of birth missing
Association footballers not categorized by position